Westover, Virginia, may refer to:

Westover, Arlington, Virginia, a neighborhood in Arlington, Virginia, United States
Westover, Charles City County, Virginia, an unincorporated community in Charles City County, Virginia, United States

See also
Westover, West Virginia